Vice Admiral Tahseen Ullah Khan is a Pakistan Navy naval officer and the current director-general of the Pakistan Maritime Security Agency. A Navy engineer officer, Khan has previously served as a Defence Attaché at the Pakistan High Commission in Malaysia and as a military advisor to the Malaysian Navy.

Education
Khan attended the military high school Cadet College Kohat where he graduated with a pre-engineering advanced diploma. He is a graduate of Pakistan Navy Staff Course and Armed Forces War Course and holds degrees of B.Sc. (Hons) in Chemical engineering from Karachi University and Master's degree in War Studies from Quaid-e-Azam University, Islamabad. He also holds a diploma in French language from National University of Modern Languages, Islamabad.

Pakistan Navy career
Khan was commissioned in Pakistan Navy on 1 December 1977. Upon attaining his commission, he was selected to undergo his training at Britannia Royal Naval College, Dartmouth, Devon, United Kingdom. On his return from UK, he joined the Submarine Service of the Pakistan Navy where-in he served onboard submarines in various capacities. He specialized in the Arms of Submarines from CIN, St. Mandrier, France in 1986. He also served as ADC to Chairman Joint Chiefs of Staff Committee from 1989–91.  He commanded two submarines; S-134 PNS Ghazi/M and S-133 PNS Mangro from 1994–96.

Defence attaché and military advisor
He served as Defence and Naval Advisor in Pakistan High Commission Kuala Lumpur (Malaysia) from 1996–1999.  On return, he was appointed at Naval Headquarters as Director Maritime Affairs and later as Director Submarine Operations.  He has also served as Deputy Director General Maritime Security Agency.  Upon his promotion to the rank of Commodore, he was appointed on the faculty of National Defence University, Islamabad in 2004 for two years from where he was appointed Commander North before being appointed as Commandant, PN War College, Lahore.

Before his appointment as Director General Maritime Security Agency, he was serving as Chief Staff Officer to Commander Pakistan Fleet. His interests include reading and relaxing by listening to music and golfing in leisure times. He is happily married with a daughter and a son.

Quotes
An ideal event for bringing together the end users and the suppliers/solutions providers discussing the issues of maritime security together.”

References

Pakistan Navy admirals
University of Karachi alumni
Pakistani chemical engineers
Pakistani military engineers
Living people
Pakistani expatriates in Malaysia
Year of birth missing (living people)
Pakistani naval attachés